The Stanford Cardinal football statistical leaders are individual statistical leaders of the Stanford Cardinal football program in various categories, including passing, rushing, receiving, total offense, all-purpose yardage, defensive stats, and kicking. Within those areas, the lists identify single-game, single-season, and career leaders. The Cardinal represent Stanford University in the NCAA's Pac-12 Conference.

Although Stanford began competing in intercollegiate football in 1891, the school's official record book generally does not lists players from before the 1940s, as records from before this year are often incomplete and inconsistent.

These lists are dominated by more recent players for several reasons:
 Since the 1940s, seasons have increased from 10 games to 11 and then 12 games in length.
 The NCAA didn't allow freshmen to play varsity football until 1972 (with the exception of the World War II years), allowing players to have four-year careers.
 Bowl games only began counting toward single-season and career statistics in 2002. Stanford has played in a bowl game 10 times since this decision, allowing players in these years (2009 through 2017) an extra game to accumulate statistics. Similarly, the Cardinal have appeared in the Pac-12 Championship Game four times since it began in 2011.
 The top nine seasons in Stanford history in both total offensive yards and points scored have all come since 1999.

These lists are updated through the end of the 2020 season.

Passing

Passing yards

Passing touchdowns

Rushing

Rushing yards

Rushing touchdowns

Receiving

Receptions

Receiving yards

Receiving touchdowns

Total offense
Total offense is the sum of passing and rushing statistics. It does not include receiving or returns.

Total offense yards

Total touchdowns

All-purpose yardage
All-purpose yardage is the sum of all yards credited to a player who is in possession of the ball. It includes rushing, receiving, and returns, but does not include passing.

Statistics are from the 2018 Stanford football record book, and will be updated if necessary to reflect results from the 2018 season. The record book lists only the top six single-game performers.

Defense

Interceptions

Tackles

Sacks

Kicking

Field goals made

Field goal percentage

References

Stanford